Yitzchok is a given name, derived from the Yiddish pronunciation of the Hebrew name for Isaac, one of the patriarchs of the Israelites. Notable people with the name include:

Yitzchok Adlerstein, American rabbi
Yitzchok Breiter, Polish Ukrainian rabbi
Yitzchok Ezrachi, Israeli rabbi
Yitzchok Friedman, first Rebbe of the Boyaner Hasidic dynasty
Yitzchok Dovid Groner, American Australian rabbi
Yitzchok Hutner, Polish American rabbi
Yitzchok Isaac Krasilschikov, Russian rabbi
Yitzchok Zev Soloveitchik, Lithuanian Israeli rabbi
Yitzchok Sorotzkin, American rabbi
Yitzchok Sternhartz, Ukrainian Israeli rabbi
Yitzchok Tuvia Weiss, Jerusalem rabbi
Yitzchok Yaakov Weiss, Austro-Hungarian rabbi
Yitzchok Zilber, Russian rabbi
Yitzchok Zilberstein, Israeli rabbi

See also
 Isaac (name)
 Yitzhak

Hebrew masculine given names